Geodermatophilus bullaregiensis is an aerobic  bacterium from the genus Geodermatophilus which has been isolated from the surface of a marble monument from Bulla Regia in Tunisia.

References

Bacteria described in 2015
Actinomycetia